The Hedgehog, the Merchant, the King and the Poor Man (Hungarian: A sündisznó; English: "The Hedgehog") is a Hungarian fairy tale collected by László Merényi and translated by folklorist Jeremiah Curtin.

The first part of the tale refers to the international cycle of Animal as Bridegroom, wherein a human maiden marries a prince cursed to be an animal. The second part of the tale belongs to the cycle of the Calumniated Wife and is classified in the international Aarne-Thompson-Uther Index as type ATU 707, "The Three Golden Children".

Summary
The tale begins with a merchant promising a hedgehog one of his daughters, after the animal helped him escape a dense forest. Only the eldest agrees to be the hedgehog's wife, which prompts him to reveal his true form as a golden-haired, golden-mouthed and golden-toothed prince. They marry and she gives birth to twins, Yanoshka and Marishka. Her middle sister, seething with envy, dumps the royal babies in the forest, but they are reared by a Forest Maiden. When they reach adulthood, their aunt sets them on a quest for "the world-sounding tree", "the world-sweetly speaking bird" and "the silver lake [with] the golden fish".

Analysis

Classification
This tale is classified in the Hungarian Folktale Catalogue (Magyar népmesekatalógus, or MNK) as type 441 and type 707.

ATU 441: Hans My Hedgehog
The first part of the tale is classified in the Aarne-Thompson-Uther Index as ATU 441, "Hans My Hedgehog", a cycle of stories where the animal bridegroom is a porcupine, a pig or a hog. Other tales of this classification are Italian The Pig King, French Prince Marcassin and Romanian The Enchanted Pig (first part).

ATU 707: The Three Golden Children
The secong part of the tale (children born with special features) is tale type ATU 707, "The Three Golden Children". Hungarian scholarship classify the ATU 707 tale under the banner of "The Golden-Haired Twins" (Hungarian: Az aranyhajú ikrek). Variants collected in Hungary and Hungarian-language territories show parallels with similar tales from nearby regions, like Grimm's The Three Little Birds.

According to Hungarian-American scholar Linda Dégh, Hungarian variants may show two forms: the golden-haired sister rescues her golden-haired brothers and reveals the truth with the help of a truth-speaking bird, or the wonder children are helped by the Brother's fairy bride.

Variants

Distribution
Professor Ágnes Kovács commented that the tale type 707 is frequent and widespread in Hungarian-language areas. In the same vein, professor Linda Dégh stated that the national Hungarian Catalogue of Folktales (MNK) listed 28 variants of the tale type and 7 deviations.

Fieldwork conducted in 1999 by researcher Zoltán Vasvári amongst the Palóc population found 3 variants of tale type 707.

Regional tales
According to scholarship, the oldest variant of tale type 707 in Hungary was registered in 1822.

Elek Benedek collected the second part of the story as an independent tale named Az Aranytollú Madár ("The Golden-Feathered Bird"), where the children are reared by a white deer, a golden-feathered bird guides the twins to their house, and they seek "the world-sounding tree", "the world-sweetly speaking bird" and "the silver lake [with] the golden fish".

In a third variant, A Szárdiniai király fia ("The Son of the King of Sardinia"), the dying King of Sardinia makes his son promise to find a suitable queen. In his travels, he and his butler pass by three princesses in a garden: the oldest says she can weave strong enough clothes for the entire army that would never tear up, the second one that she can make a bread of corn to feed the army, and the youngest sister promises golden-haired twins, a boy with the sun on his forehead, and a girl with a star on the front. A creature named Kuvik, the "bird of death", takes the children as soon as they are born and throws them in the sea. The pair is saved by a fisherman and his wife. Years later, they decide to seek their true parents and meet a beggar man on the road, to whom they give alms. Seeing their good heart, the beggar summons a supernatural helper to guide them. Kuvik then convinces the twins to seek a mirror that can see the whole world. Later, they go to the public square to tend to and bathe their mother, sewn in seven buffalo skins and exposed.

In another Hungarian tale, A tizenkét aranyhajú gyermek ("The Twelve Golden-Haired Children"), the youngest of three sisters promises the king to give birth to twelve golden-haired boys. This variant is unique in that another woman also gives birth to twelve golden-haired children, all girls, who later marry the twelve princes.

In the tale A tengeri kisasszony ("The Maiden of the Sea"), the youngest sister promises to give birth to an only child with golden hair, a star on his forehead and a moon on his chest. The promised child is born, but cast into the water by the cook. The miller finds the boy and raises him. Years later, the king, on a walk, takes notice of the boy and adopts him, which was consented by the miller. When the prince comes to court, the cook convinces the boy to search for "the bird that drinks from the golden and silver water, and whose singing can be heard from miles", the mirror that can see the whole world and the Maiden of the Sea.

Another version, Az aranyhajú gyermekek ("The Golden-Haired Children"), skips the introduction about the three sisters: the queen gives birth to a boy with a golden star on the forehead and a girl with a small flower on her arm. They end up adopted by a neighbouring king and an old woman threatens the girl with a cruel punishment if the twins do not retrieve the bird from a cursed castle.

In the tale A boldogtalan királyné ("The Unhappy Queen"), the youngest daughter of a carpenter becomes a queen and bears three golden-haired children, each with a star on their foreheads. They are adopted by a fisherman; the boys become fine hunters and venture into the woods to find a willow tree, a talking bird on a branch and to collect water from a well that lies near the tree.

In Tündér Ilona és az aranyhajú fiú; or Fee Ilona und der goldhaarige Jüngling ("Fairy Ilona and the golden-haired Youth"), of the Brother quests for a Bride format, the Sister is told by an old lady about the wonderful belongings of the fabled Fairy Ilona (Ilona Tünder) and passes this information to her brother as if she saw them in a dream.

In the tale Jankalovics, the youngest sister, a herb-gatherer, promises the king twin children with golden hair. When the twins are cast out in the water, they are rescued by a miller. In their youth, they find out they are adopted and leave the miller's home to seek out their origins. During their travels, they give alms to three beggars and they reward the twins by summoning a creature named Jankalovics to act as the twins' helper.

In the tale Az aranyhajú hármasok ("The Triplets with Golden-Hair"), the baker's youngest daughter gives birth to triplets with golden hair and a star on the forehead. The usual story follows, but the older male twins meet the king during a hunt, who invites the youths three times for a feast. In the third time, the truth is revealed in front of the whole court.

Bishop János Kriza (hu) collected another version, Aranyhajú Kálmán ("Golden-Haired Kálman"), wherein the youngest sister promises the king an only son with golden hair. Years later, the boy, Kalman, quests for a magical tree branch, a mirror that can see the whole world and Világlátó, the world-famed beauty.

In the tale Az aranyhajú királyfiak ("The King's Sons with Golden Hair"), collected by Elek Benedek, the youngest sister promises the king two golden-haired boys. They are born and a witch from the king's court casts them in the water. They are saved and grow up as fine youths. The king sees them one day and invites them for a dinner at the castle. The witch, then, sends both of the brothers in a series of quests: to bathe in the water of the Sun, to dry themselves with the cloth/towel of the Sun and to see themselves in the Sun's mirror. The brothers are helped by incarnations of Friday, Holy Saturday and the Holy Sunday. The tale was translated into French by Michel Klimo with the title Les Deux Princes aux Cheveux d'Or, albeit with some differences: the twins are already born by the time the king goes to war and has to leave his wife.

In a tale collected by Gyula Ortutay from storyteller Mihály Fedics, and published in 1940, Az aranyhajú két testvér ("The Two Siblings with Golden Hair"), a prince and a servant take a journey through distant lands and pass by three women, who express their wishes to marry the king based on their great skills in weaving and cooking. The third, however, promises to bear two children with golden hair, unlike any other seen in the world. The prince marries the third woman and she gives birth to two children. The midwife, the iron-nosed witch, takes the babies to be trampled by the cows, the horses, and the sows, but they are suckled by the female ones. The witch then casts them in a box in the sea. The box is saved by a poor fisherman and his wife, who sell their golden hair to earn money. After leaving their adoptive home, the sister wants her brother to search for "three lilac leaves that produce music", a world-seeing mirror, and the worldly beautiful Erzsók as a bride for him and companion for her.

In a similarly named tale collected in 1976 with the title Az aranyhajú ikrek ("The Golden-Haired Twins"), a queen gives birth to her two golden-haired children while the king is away, but the midwife replaces the babies for animals and throws them in the water. The twins are saved by a fisherman, meet the king years later and are invited for a feast with their father in the castle, where the midwife tries to poison them.

In the tale Az aranyhajú gyermekek ("The Golden-Haired Children"), collected from Hungarian-Romani teller János Cifra, a king dies and orders a nurse to take care of the prince. One day, the prince goes for a walk in his carriage and three bathing maidens see him. Each of them wanted the prince to fetch their garment, and the third says that if the prince gets hers, she will marry him and bear golden-haired children, a boy with the sunlight and two stars on the forehead and a girl with the moonlight and one star on the front. The prince marries this girl. One day, he goes to war and leaves his wife under a midwife's care, who replaces the twins for puppies. The children are cast in the water, but survive and are saved by a miller. They are expelled from home, but meet a friendly old man on their way, who gives them means to build a castle and a black-coloured helper named Vasbug. The evil midwife visits the pair and convinces the girl to ask for a golden palm tree and a golden finch on a golden cage. The brother also happens to find the fairy Tündér Ilona, who claims she is destined to become his bride and join him in the mortal world.

In the tale Világvámosa ("The Toll-Keeper of the World"), collected from teller János Puji, in Marosszentkirály (Sâncraiu de Mureș) by ethnographer Olga Nagy (hu) and published in 1978, a prince that is single wishes to marry a girl that can give him two golden-haired children. One day, he is riding near the hemp fields where three women are cutting hemp and talking, and one of them says she ill bear two golden-haired children, a boy and a girl. This woman is chosen by the king as his wife. A jealous witch puts the woman's head in a chimney to cloud her vision while she takes the twins and casts them in the sea in a box. The children are saved by a miller, but one day they are expelled from their adoptive home for breaking a jar. On the way, they meet a beggar asking for alms. The twins give him alms. Because of their good heart, the beggar summons a creature named Vasbug to help the twins in their quest for their true parents. Vasbug summons a castle for them, and the witch visits them to set them on a quest for a branch of the Reverbing Tree from the Dark World, a bird that sings Twelve Masses, and destined spouses for each of them: a man named Villámlás (Lightning), located in the Dark World, and a fairy woman named Tündér Ilona.

In a tale collected from teller István Babos, in Babócsa, and published in 2003 with the title Az aranyfogú és az aranyhajú gyerek ("The Children with Golden Teeth and Golden Hair"), a poor woman's three daughters go to the fields to cut and gather hemp. They see the king riding on his horse and a retinue and state their wishes, the youngest saying that if she marries the king, she will bear him golden-toothed and golden-haired children. The king decides to make this woman his wife and marries her. However, the sorcerous royal cook replaces the twins for puppies and throws them in the sea. They survive. Years later, the cook visits them and convinces the girl to seek a golden apple tree, which yields golden fruits on one side and golden flowers on the other, and a magical cookbook. He gets both objects with the help of a dwarf. However, the brother burns the cookbook and brings home with him an old magical woman who reveals the truth to the king during a banquet.

Subtypes
Hungarian compilations also attest two other narratives of type ATU 707: a set of stories where the king's wife bears twins who are buried in the ground and go through a cycle of transformations (akin to Romanian The Boys with the Golden Stars); and another cycle, wherein mother and son are thrown in the sea in a barrel (akin to Russian The Tale of Tsar Saltan).

Boys with the Golden Stars form
In the tale Die zwei goldhaarigen Kinder (Hungarian: "A két aranyhajú gyermek"; English: "The Two Children with Golden Hair"), of The Boys With Golden Stars format. The tale begins akin to tale type ATU 450, "Brother and Sister", wherein the boy drinks from a puddle and becomes a deer, and his  sister is found by the king during a hunt. The sister, in this variant, begs the king to take her, for she will bear him twin sons with golden hair. After the twin boys are born, they are buried in the ground and go through a cycle of transformations, from golden-leaved trees, to lambs to humans again. When they assume human form, the Moon, the Sun and the Wind give them clothes and shoes. This tale was collected in Pürkerec.

Another of the first group is A mosolygó alma ("The Smiling Apple"), a king sends his page to pluck some fragrant scented apples in a distant garden. When the page arrives at the garden, a dishevelled old man appears and takes him into his house, where the old man's three young daughters live. The daughters comment among themselves their marriage wishes: the third wishes to marry the king and give him two golden-haired children, one with a "comet star" on the forehead and another with a sun.

In the tale A mostoha királyfiakat gyilkoltat, the step-parent asks for the organs of the twin children to eat. They are killed, their bodies are buried in the garden and from their grave two apple trees sprout. Later, the two children become lambs and finally regain human form.

In the tale Az aranyhajú ikrek ("The Golden-Haired Children"), published in 1987, the king overhears the conversation between three women that are cutting grass, the third one saying that she will bear two golden-haired children to him. The king marries her and she gives birth to her children, a boy and a girl, but an iron-nosed witch takes the babies and buries them in the garden. The twins sprout as golden pine trees that are felled to become beds; the beds are burned, but two sparks fly out and become two golden-fleeced lambs. The witch orders them to be killed and their fleece to be washed in the river, but two strands of hair are washed away by the current and become the twins again.

Tale of Tsar Saltan form
Of the second group is Nád Péter ("Schilf-Peter"): the only son of a king wishes to join his father's twelve hunters in the hunt. His father agrees and lets him go; on the way, three princesses from another kingdom see the prince and express their wishes to marry him, the youngest saying that if she becomes his wife, she will bear him 12 golden-haired sons. The prince and the third princess marry, and she gives birth to her fabled sons. Her sisters forge a letter with a command to kill the queen and throw her sons in the sea in a box. Eleven boys are cast in one box, and the youngest is cast with his mother in another. Mother and son wash ashore on an island and are helped by St. Peter and Christ. This tale was sourced from Szováta, in Székely Land.

References 

Hungarian fairy tales
Fictional hedgehogs
Fiction about shapeshifting
Child characters in literature
Male characters in fairy tales
Fictional princes
Fictional twins
Twins in fiction
ATU 400-459
ATU 700-749